Heaven is Miliyah Kato's fifth studio album. It was released on July 28, 2010.

Album information
Heaven contains singles "Why, "Bye Bye" and "Last Love". It was released in two editions: a CD and a CD+DVD edition which contains a limited 52-page booklet and a DVD with the music videos of the singles, as well as the music videos for promo singles "Destiny" and "Sensation". The DVD also contains live performances from Kato's 2009 Ring Tour in Tokyo.

Track listing

Chart performance and certifications
The album debuted at number-one on the Oricon weekly album chart selling over 151,000 units, making it Miliyah's first studio album to debut at the top position on the Oricon charts.

Charts

Sales and certifications

References

2010 albums
Miliyah Kato albums